Lower Sinjol is a village in the Peren district of Nagaland, India. It is located in the Kebai Khelma Circle.

Demographics 

According to the 2011 census of India, Lower Sinjol has 25 households. The effective literacy rate (i.e. the literacy rate of population excluding children aged 6 and below) is 92.41%.

References 

Villages in Kebai Khelma Circle